Thalia Field (born 1966) is an American author known for innovative fiction and interdisciplinary literature. She teaches experimental fiction and interdisciplinary performance at Brown University, where she also serves as Faculty Director of the Brown Arts Institute.

Field has published four books with New Directions Publishing, most recently Personhood, which is the companion volume to Bird Lovers, Backyard from 2010. Both books inquire into human-animal dilemmas and tragic human-animal narratives that surround us.

Her recent novel, Experimental Animals (A Reality Fiction)], published by Solid Objects (NY) is a collage-based and genre-blending novel that explores the origins of both experimental literature and modern experimental bio-medicine. Based on the marriage of Claude and Fanny Bernard, the novel also features women activists who have been overlooked in science history and focuses particularly on the living animal body in pain (vivisection) as foundational to the history of physiology.

In collaboration with French writer/translator Abigail Lang, she has published a lyric essay, A Prank of Georges, with Essay Press, and an experimental essay collaboration, Leave to Remain (Legends of Janus), with Dalkey Archive in 2020.

A "performance novel", ULULU (Clown Shrapnel), published by Coffee House Press 2007, tells the ficto-critical biography of the character "Lulu" in innovative and musical prose, calling to mind Joyce's Finnegans Wake.

References

External links
 https://www.thenation.com/article/culture/personhood-thalia-field/
 Bomb Magazine: Fanny's Lament -- An extra chapter of Experimental Animals (commissioned by BOMB)
 Slate: Emily Anthes on Frankenstein and Vivisection
 The Rumpus: Interview with Jenny Boully about Experimental Animals
 An experimental theater piece by Field, "Experimental Theater Is history! (The Photo and Infinite Play)"
 Hermeneutics beyond the Species Boundary Explanation and Understanding in Animal Narratives, by David Herman
 The Question of Evolution in the Buddhist Ecology of Thalia Field’s Bird Lovers, Backyard, by Gillian Parrish Washington University in St. Louis
 Backward/Forward, Thalia Field's Metanarratives, by Jan Baetens, Éric Trudel
 Use Everything: An Interview with Thalia Field, by Jorge Armenteros
www.thaliafield.com

American women writers
American editors
1966 births
Living people
Brown University faculty
American women academics
21st-century American women